is a Japanese manga series written and illustrated by Wataru Watanabe. It began serialization in the 12th issue of Akita Shoten’s shōnen manga magazine Weekly Shōnen Champion in 2008, and as of October 2022, the series has been compiled into 80 tankōbon volumes. The manga has been licensed in North America by Yen Press in 2015. Several new mangas continue to be published.

An anime television series adaptation aired from October 2013 to July 2014, followed by a second season aired from October 2014 to March 2015, a third season aired from January to June 2017, a fourth season aired from January to June 2018, and a fifth season premiered in October 2022. The first three seasons have been licensed by Discotek Media in North America in 2014. A live-action television drama adaptation aired in August 2016. A live-action film adaptation was released on August 14, 2020.

As of September 2022, Yowamushi Pedal had over 28 million copies in circulation, making it one of the best-selling manga series. In 2015, the manga won the Best Shōnen Manga award at the 39th Kodansha Manga Awards.

Plot
Sakamichi Onoda is an otaku who has just entered high school. In middle school, Onoda did not have any friends with whom he could talk about his interests, and hopes to change that by joining his new school's anime club. However, he is crushed when he discovers the anime club has been disbanded due to lack of interest, and in order to reestablish the club, four new members must join.

Since he was a little boy, Onoda has ridden his city bicycle (referred to as a "mamachari", meaning "Mommy Bike", in the anime)—a simple and bulky bicycle designed for short rides—for transportation and fun. A fellow freshman, and much more serious cyclist, named Shunsuke Imaizumi notices Onoda riding his mamachari and mocks him inwardly until he sees Onoda riding up a steep hill with little effort. Another student named Naruko visits Akihabara to get some plastic Gundam models for his younger brothers and meets Onoda, who catches his attention because of his cycling skill on the mamachari. Later on, both Naruko and Imaizumi try to convince him to join the bicycle racing club at their high school, Sohoku.

Teams and characters

Sohoku High School
Sohoku is a hard-working team that acts as the main school in the story. The team is characterized as being able to overcome internal conflicts and brutal training. For example, Sohoku hosts an intense and gruelling 1000 km training camp every year to determine who will advance to the main race of the series, the Inter-High.

Live action actor: Yuuki Ogoe (TV Series), Ren Nagase (Movie)
Onoda is the main protagonist of the series, a first-year high school student, and a member of the Sohoku High Bicycle Club. His personality is initially characterized as being a shy otaku with a difficulty in speaking up for himself. However, after joining the bicycle club, his confidence receives a dramatic boost, and the love and admiration he has for his fellow teammates becomes apparent. Since the very beginning of the series, Onoda shows steady stamina and high cadence abilities when riding uphill, and thus, the captain of the team, Kinjou, makes Onoda one of the team’s climbers. To nurture Onoda’s ability to climb for long periods of time, Kinjou assigns Makishima, a fellow climber and third-year, to tutor him. Onoda’s best cycling ability, the team finds out, is that he performs best when chasing someone in the lead. When Onoda enters the Inter-High, he performs amazing feats for his team such as passing more than 100 cyclists after a crash and drafting Tadokoro, who was recovering from stomach pain, for almost 70km from the back of the race to the front where the rest of the team is.

Live action actor:  (TV Series), Kentaro Ito (Movie)
Imaizumi is a popular first-year high school student and a member of the Sohoku High Bicycle Club. Imaizumi is a logical thinker with a generally dry personality, although, when entangled in certain situations, he can become quite frenzied and passionate. Because he dreams of one day becoming the fastest cyclist in the world, his cycling style is defined as an all-rounder. Because of Imaizumi's customarily coarse personality, his relationship with his teammates varies from person to person. For example, he has an intense rivalry with fellow teammate Naruko because of his sprinting abilities and overall attitude, likewise, he sees the captain, Kinjou, as his biggest obstacle. On the other hand, Imaizumi is seen being fairly gentle and kind towards Onoda.

Live action actor: Taiga Fukuzawa (TV Series); Ryota Bando (Movie)
Naruko is a first-year high school student from Osaka, and a member of the Sohoku High Bicycle Club. Naruko’s personality is sharp, spunky, and highly competitive, however, he takes cycling very seriously, and often gets very upset if he is defeated in a race, even if it is by another teammate. He is a high-energy sprinter, and his vitality often gets fueled by his mentor, Tadokoro, a fellow sprinter and third-year, who he affectionately refers to as “old man.” He maintains a friendly rivalry with Imaizumi, and is always supportive and caring towards Onoda.

Live action actor: Naoya Goumoto (TV Series), Ryo Ryusei (Movie)
Kinjou is a sunglasses-wielding third-year high school student and captain of the Sohoku High Bicycle Club. He is an all-rounder cyclist with an amazing iron will in addition to being Sohoku’s ace. Kinjou comes off as having an icy personality, but throughout the series, he continuously shows that he has the best intentions for his team at heart. Kinjou works incredibly hard to bring out the best in everyone’s cycling abilities, especially Imaizumi, who he considers his mentee.

Live action actor: Ryōma Baba (TV Series), Shuntaro Yanagi (Movie)
Makishima is a third-year high school student and member of the Sohoku High Bicycle Team. Makishima is the ace climber of the team and has the nickname of “Peak Spider” due to his unusual dancing technique when cycling uphill. His generally awkward personality, in addition to his strange looks, makes Makishima seem unapproachable or even frightening. However, throughout the series, he offers wise advice to his mentee, Onoda, about cycling. Makishima is also well known for having a longtime, intimate rivalry with Hakone’s ace climber, Toudou.

Live action actor: Yūki Tomotsune (TV Series), Ken Sugawara (Movie)
Tadokoro is a third-year high school student and member of the Sohoku High Bicycle Team. Despite his bulkiness, he is the team’s ace sprinter, and oftentimes throughout the series, takes advantage of his large body to perform his signature riding style “Human Bullet Train,” where he drafts wind for the team as they ride behind him. He is sometimes seen as the “fatherly” member of the team, having been a mentor to Naruko, Teshima, and Aoyagi.

Live action actor: Kousuke Kujirai
Teshima is a second-year high school student and member of the Sohoku High Bicycle Club. Teshima is a climber who works as a duo with fellow teammate Aoyagi. During the 1000 km training camp, he injures his legs in the final stretch and loses to the first-years, thus losing a spot in the Inter-High. He has an outgoing, cheerful, yet serious personality that never fails to keep the other members in high spirits. Teshima is most noted for having a very close relationship with Aoyagi, a fellow second-year. He is often seen “reading Aoyagi’s mind,” and knowing how Aoyagi is feeling or what he wants without him having to speak or show facial expressions. Teshima becomes the new captain of the club as the third-years leave.

Live action actor: Ryō Yashima
Aoyagi is a second-year high school student and member of the Sohoku High Bicycle Club. Aoyagi is an all-rounder rider who works as a duo with fellow teammate Teshima. He considers himself to be “unskilled,” but usually manages to claim first place in races with Teshima’s help. However, like Teshima, he injures himself in the final stretch of the 1000 km training camp and loses a spot in the Inter-High. Aoyagi is a very quiet boy who spends most of his time with Teshima, however, it is not uncommon to see him grow more vocal in stressful situations. Aoyagi becomes the new vice-captain of the club as the third-years leave.

Live action actor: Hiroki Harai (TV Series), Mizuki Inoue (Movie)
Sugimoto is a first-year high school student and member of the Sohoku High Bicycle Club. He avidly claims to be an “experienced rider,” and often offers advice to the fellow first-years. However, his actual skills are very slim, and he does not even fall into an all-rounder, climber, or sprinter category. His lack of skill becomes even more apparent when he fails to complete the 1000 km training camp because he refused to cycle in the rain. In the case of Onoda, Sugimoto's advice is given not out of ego but a genuine desire to be helpful. With Onoda being very new to the sport, Sugimoto's explanations of the basics greatly benefited him, for which he remains grateful for.

 Koga Kimitaka is a second-year high school student and member of the Sohoku High Bicycle Club. It is later revealed that he sustained injuries in the previous Inter-High, leading to his withdrawal the 1000 km training camp to recover. His nickname is the "Stamina Simpleton", for his seemingly unending stamina, which he demonstrates by scouting the entire route of the 42nd Inter-High by himself.

Sugimoto Sadatoki is Terufumi Sugimoto Younger Brother and is a first-year high school student and member of the Sohoku High Bicycle Club.

Hakone Academy

Hakone Academy is the country's largest cycling team, and claims to be made up of “six aces” with many more in reserve. During the first year of the series, it was noted to have 50 club members. Since Hakone is such an expansive team, the selection process of who does, and does not, go to the Inter-High is quite complex. To determine who has the honor of participating in the Inter-High, all of the members race against each other, and only the winners of each group (A - F), are allowed to participate. Furthermore, these groups are divided so that the team takes three all-rounders, two climbers, and up to two sprinters to the Inter-High.

Live action actor: Keisuke Ueda
Manami is a first-year high school student and a member of the Hakone Academy Bicycle Club. Manami is very easy-going and easily distracted by nature, cycling, and the feeling of complete freedom. He is the mentee climber to third-year, Toudou, and serves as Hakone’s second climber during the Inter-High. Though for different reasons, Onoda and he have a similar joy for climbing hills and the two hit it off almost immediately as friends and competitors. His most notable feature is that people hallucinate seeing wings on his back when he reaches his top speeds during a race. He accomplishes this by reading the wind conditions, then shifts upwards and dances when gusts come up from behind. His skill allowed him to win his club heats and join the Inter-High team, the first first-year to do so in the club's history.

Live action actor: Ryo Kitamura
Toudou is a popular third-year student and a member of the Hakone Academy Bicycle Club. Toudou is the ace climber of Hakone, and mentor to first-year, Manami. His climbing style is fast and silent, and combined with his good looks, gives him the nickname “Sleeping Beauty,” as he manages to sneak up on cyclists in front of him and pass them without their knowledge. His personality is very pompous, and he thinks very highly of himself. Toudou has many female fans who tend to inflate his ego, however, his strong relationship with Sohoku’s ace climber, Makishima, who he affectionately calls “Maki-chan,” tends to mellow him out again. Toudou is most often noted for his very intimate rivalry with Makishima.

 Live action actor: Eiji Takigawa
Fukutomi is a third-year high school student and captain of the Hakone Academy Bicycle Club. Fukutomi is an all-rounder and ace of the team. His serious, straightforward personality and unchanging expression has earned him the nickname “Iron Mask.” In addition to being remembered as the ace of Hakone, he is known for getting distraught during a past race and injuring himself and Sohoku’s Kinjou, with whom he has had a longtime rivalry. This makes him resolve to win against Sohoku in this years match, hoping it will be atonement for what he did. Throughout the Inter-High, he is often seen sporting his catchphrase, “I’m strong.”

Live action actor: Shuto Miyazaki
Shinkai is a third-year high school student and member of the Hakone Academy Bicycle Club. Shinkai is the team’s ace sprinter, and claims to have a “monster locked up inside of him” that gets “released” during especially stressful races. Shinkai’s personality is usually relaxed and easy-going, and he is often seen with a power bar in his mouth and striking his signature “bakyun!” pose. In a past race, Shinkai ran over and killed a mother rabbit, leaving an orphaned kit who he then adopted. Because of his guilt, Shinkai stopped cycling for his team transiently, and became unable to pass other riders during races on the left side since that was what happened when he killed the rabbit. Although he is the ace sprinter, it was decided it would be best for him to not participate in the first sprinters race (first check point) during day one of the Inter high race and have Izumida represent their team during that day. Later he would race against Midousuji during the second one on the second day.

Live action actor: Hiroki Suzuki
Arakita is a third-year high school student and member of the Hakone Academy Bicycle Club. Arakita is a skilled, albeit reckless, all-rounder cycler who was introduced to cycling in high school by Fukutomi; he had never ridden one previously, instead racing around on a scooter. He had originally chosen to attend Hakone Gakuen because it did not have a baseball club; an elbow injury prevented him from playing. His personality is described as wolf-like, and he generally seems very unapproachable. However, since joining the bicycle club, he has formed a strong bond with Fukutomi, and affectionately calls him “Fuku-chan.” During the race, he pairs up with Onoda and Manami to get out of a pinch, and from then on starts calling Onoda "Onoda-chan", seemingly since he gets fond of Onoda's honest personality and pure desire to catch up.

Live action actor: Soramu Aoki
Izumida is a second-year high school student and member of the Hakone Academy Bicycle Club. Izumida is the team’s second year sprinter who often receives “warnings” about dangerous situations during races from his pecs, Andy and Frank (named after the famous pro bicycle racers from Luxembourg, brothers Andy Schleck and Fränk Schleck.) In the 2017 season, he starts calling upon his upper dorsal muscle, that he's called Fabian (after pro Swiss bicycle racer Fabian Cancellara.) He is quite vain and cares a lot about his appearance, which becomes obvious as he is seen throughout the series doing a tough workout routine. When racing, Izumida usually rides without holding his handlebars, and only zips up his jersey when he gets serious. When producing an effort, he chants "Abs, abs, abs, abs...!", a call of support to his chiseled abs. He greatly admires the teams ace sprinter, Hayato Shinkai.

 Live action actor: Ryūtarō Akimoto
Kuroda is a second-year high school student and member of the Hakone Academy Bicycle Club. In the race to see who competed in the Inter-High, he loses to first-year, and fellow climber, Manami. In season 3, when he became a third year, he became the second climber along with Manami as Arakita, Fukutomi, Toudou, and Shinkai graduated.

Kyoto Fushimi High School
Kyoto Fushimi, or Kyofushi, acts as the third squad in this series and is the wild card of the main three teams. The team has a history as a strong team, where 1st year cyclists would go to become stronger. Its training practices are unknown, but other teams say they were a lot nicer in previous years before Midousuji joined the team.

 Live action actor: Mitsu Murata
Midousuji is a first-year high school student and member of the Kyoto Fushimi Bicycle Club. Midousuji is an all-rounder, and he is the newfound ace of the team. He is the best climber against all all-rounders in the team. His ruthless personality, paired with his ever-smiling face and habit of calling everything and everyone "gross," gives Midousuji an unapproachable and unsettling atmosphere. He's known by other teams for his tactical expertise, and plans out the events of a race in great detail while taking into account for nearly every possibility. He aims for international acclaim as the fastest cyclist, and will stop at nothing in the pursuit of victory. Midousuji is known for having a rivalry with Sohoku's Shunsuke Imaizumi. In the next year, he relinquished his role as Ace, and became Ace Assistant to Mizuta.

Ishigaki is a third-year high school student and captain of the Kyoto Fushimi Bicycle Club. Ishigaki is an all-rounder and, before Midousuji joined the team, was the ace. With his position as ace taken from him, he becomes Midousuji's assist. Though he initially dislikes Midousuji, he comes to understand him better over the duration of the 41st Inter-high and aims to do anything he can to see Midousuji grow as a person and win.

Mizuta is a second-year high school student and member of the Kyoto Fushimi Bicycle Club. He is an all-rounder. Mizuta is very easily influenced by those who he admires. Before Midousuji joined the team, he greatly admired Ishigaki and styled his hair just like his. However, once Midousuji joined the team, Mizuta began to admire him for his cycling strength and attempts to imitate Midousuji, getting braces to straighten out his teeth and even imitating some of his odd quirks. Mizuta seeks recognition from those he admires and will do whatever he can to obtain it.

Ihara is a third-year high school student and member of the Kyoto Fushimi Bicycle Club. Ihara is one of the team's sprinters and is a friend of Ishigaki's. He was quick to reject Midousuji as the team's ace and even rallied against it, only to fall into place for the sake of his team.

Yamaguchi is a second-year high school student and member of the Kyoto Fushimi Bicycle Club. Yamaguchi is a sprinter and avoids conflict within his team, giving him a quiet, passive demeanor.

Tsuji is a third-year high school student and member of the Kyoto Fushimi Bicycle Club. Tsuji is a climber with a stoic demeanor and serious expression, and tries to avoid conflict within his team.

Hiroshima Kureminami Technical High School
Hiroshima is known to have no all-rounders, and 3 sprinters.

Eikichi is a third-year high school student and member of the Kureminami Bicycle Club. Eikichi cycling style is sprinting, and he also serves as the ace for his team. He is well known for having a rivalry with the entirety of Hakone, as well as having the nickname “The Fighting Dog of Kure.” He manipulated the pack full of sprinter on day 3 to get back to the pack, but when Hiroshima broke away, they left out of steam in the mountain sections and completely dropped out.

Supporting characters

 Live action actor: Yūya Asato
Touji is the eldest sibling of the Kanzakis and is the former captain of Sohoku. During his cycling career he was a sprinter, although he currently runs his family’s bicycle shop and supports the current members of Sohoku.

 Live action actor: Minami Sakurai (TV Series), Kanna Hashimoto (Movie)
Miki is a first-year high school student at Sohoku as well as the younger sibling to Touji. The family business resulted in her being passionate about bicycles and extensive knowledge about road racing, even though she's not a racer herself. She works in the shop as another mechanic on her off hours. She joins the Sohoku High Bicycle Club as team manager, and is often seen at their racing events supporting the team.

Tachibana is a first-year high school student at Sohoku, member of the tennis club, and close friend to Miki.

Pierre is the coach of the Sohoku High Bicycle Club and is most noted for giving Onoda tips on being a better cyclist. He is Caucasian and an English teacher on Sohoku's teaching staff. He sometimes peppers the occasional English word in his sentences.
 

Miyahara is a first-year high school student and president of Manami’s class at Hakone Academy. She has been friends with Manami since childhood and is well known for having a crush on him.

Himeno is the main character of Onoda’s favorite anime series, Love Hime. Onoda is often seen singing the opening to the series, “Koi no Hime Hime Pettanko,” when he needs to raise his cadence and spirits.

Orson is Japanese import side character added to the series during the inter-high during the 387th chapter of the manga. Orson becomes the rival of Yamakaji. He cycles for the team Fukijaru

Fraser is an Australian/Japanese import side character added to the series during the inter-high during the 387th chapter of the manga. Fraser becomes the most powerful cyclist, but is outdone by the seemingly endless power of the Japanese cycling academies vastness of his interhigh rival Kakigōri. He cycles for the team Kansai.

Media

Manga

Yowamushi Pedal is written and illustrated by Wataru Watanabe, and the manga began serialization in the 12th issue of Akita Shoten's shōnen manga magazine Weekly Shōnen Champion on February 21, 2008. The series was later published in tankōbon format by Akita Shoten, with the first volume being released on July 8, 2008. As of October 2022, 80 volumes have been published.

On August 8, 2013, a limited-edition version of the 29th volume of Yowamushi Pedal was released with a bundled anime DVD directed by Osamu Nabeshime and produced by TMS Entertainment.

The manga is published in English by Yen Press in North America, who are releasing the series as two-in-one omnibuses. The first omnibus volume was released on December 15, 2015.

A tribute manga titled Hōkago Pedal High Cadence began serialization in Akita Shoten's Monthly Princess magazine on February 6, 2023.

Anime

The first season of Yowamushi Pedal, produced by TMS Entertainment aired from October 7, 2013, to July 1, 2014, on TV Tokyo. The second season, Yowamushi Pedal Grande Road, aired from October 6, 2014, to March 30, 2015, in Japan. A third season, titled Yowamushi Pedal: New Generation, was announced on October 6, 2015, at a film screening of Yowamushi Pedal: The Movie, which aired from January 10 to June 26, 2017. The fourth season, titled Yowamushi Pedal: Glory Line, aired from January 8 to June 25, 2018. A fifth season, titled Yowamushi Pedal: Limit Break, premiered on October 10, 2022, on NHK General TV.

In North America, Discotek Media licensed the first two seasons of the series within the region, and Crunchyroll simulcast the series on their service. Crunchyroll is also the master English licensee of the third season of the series worldwide. In Australia and New Zealand, Madman Entertainment acquired the home media and streaming rights for the first two seasons, and streamed the series on AnimeLab.

Theme songs
Opening Theme
 by Rookiez is Punk'd - episodes 1-12
 by Dirty Old Men - episodes 13 - 25
"Be as One" by Team Sohoku - episodes 26 - 38
"Determination" by Lastgasp - Grande Road, episodes 1 - 12
 by Rookiez is Punk'd - Grande Road, episodes 13 - 24
"Cadence" (ケイデンス Keidensu) by Natsushiro Takaaki - New Generation, episodes 1 - 12
"Transit" (トランジット Toranjitto) by Natsushiro Takaaki - New Generation, episodes 13 - 24
Ending Theme
"Top of Tops!" by Miki Kanzaki (Ayaka Suwa), OVA ending theme
 by Under Graph - episodes 1 - 12
"I'm Ready" by Autribe feat. Dirty Old Men - episodes 13 - 25
"Glory Road" by Team Hakone Academy - episodes 26 - 38
"DAYS" by Lastgasp - Re: Ride movie
 by Rookiez is Punk'd - Grande Road, episodes 1-12
 by Magic of Life - Grande Road, episodes 12 - 24
"Believer" by Lastgasp - Re: Road movie
"Link" by Lastgasp - Yowamushi Pedal: The Movie
"Now Or Never" (ナウオアネバー) by Saeki Yuusuke - New Generation, episodes 1 - 12
"Takai Tokoro" (タカイトコロ) by Saeki Yuusuke - New Generation, episodes 13 - 24
Insert Song
 by Kotori Himeno (Yukari Tamura) - Season 1 episodes 3, 5, 11, and 26 and GRANDE ROAD episode 24

Film
Yowamushi Pedal: Re: RIDE and Yowamushi Pedal: Re: ROAD recap the first two seasons of the anime with additional new content.

Yowamushi Pedal: The Movie (劇場版 弱虫ペダル, Gekijōban Yowamushi Pedaru?), which was released on August 28, 2015, hinted a third season. The film was released on Malaysia on January 7, 2016.

Yowamushi Pedal: Re:GENERATION is a film adaptation of the third season.

An anime theatrical film adaptation of the Yowamushi Pedal: Spare Bike spin-off manga premiered in Japanese theaters for 2 weeks, starting September 9, 2016. It tells the past of the third year seniors

There is an OVA titled Yowamushi Pedal: Special Ride. Chiba Pedal: Yowamushi Pedal to Manabu Jitensha Koutsuu Anzen is a collaboration ad campaign for bicycle safety.

In May 2019, Discotek Media announced the acquisition of Yowamushi Pedal: Re:RIDE and Yowamushi Pedal: Re: ROAD for a BD release on July 30.

A live-action film adaptation of the manga was announced and set to premiere on August 14, 2020, it is directed by Kōichirō Miki.

Mobile game
Yowamushi Pedal: Puchitto (Petit) Racers (弱虫ペダルぷちっとレーサーズ) was a phone app by FuRyu available for iOS and Android, and functions as a collector game between 2016-2018.

Television drama
A live-action television drama adaptation of the manga was announced in the Weekly Shōnen Champion magazine's 26th issue of 2016 and premiered in August 2016 on BS SKY PerfecTV!. The series is directed by Takayoshi Tanazawa and written by Kōta Fukihara.

A sequel premiered on August 18, 2017, on BS SKY PerfecTV!.
The series is also simulcasted with its Japanese broadcast on WakuWaku Japan in Indonesia, Myanmar, Singapore, Taiwan, Sri Lanka, and Mongolia.

During the filming of the sequel, Eiji Takigawa received spinal injuries after crashing into a curb, and was taken to the nearest hospital in a helicopter. Immediately after the accident, he was unable to move any body part below the head, but slowly regained movement in his arms. He was released from hospital in October 2018, 13 months after the accident.

Reception

Manga
The Yowamushi Pedal manga won the Best Shōnen Manga award along with The Seven Deadly Sins manga at the 39th Kodansha Manga Awards in 2015.

By May 2017, the manga had 17 million copies in circulation; over 27 million copies in circulation by July 2021; and over 28 million copies in circulation by September 2022.

See also
Nasu: Summer in Andalusia
Magimoji Rurumo, another manga series made by the same author

References

External links
  
 

2013 anime television series debuts
2014 anime television series debuts
2017 anime television series debuts
2018 anime television series debuts
2022 anime television series debuts
Akita Shoten manga
Anime series based on manga
Crunchyroll anime
Cycle racing in Japan
Cycling in anime and manga
Discotek Media
Japanese sports comedy-drama films
Manga adapted into films
Shōjo manga
Shōnen manga
TMS Entertainment
TV Tokyo original programming
Toho Animation
Winner of Kodansha Manga Award (Shōnen)
Yen Press titles